Patsy Moran (born 1951) was an Irish hurler who played for club Kilkenny Championship clubs Muckalee-Ballyfoyle Rangers and St Martin's. He played at senior level for the Kilkenny county team for a brief period, during which time he usually lined out as a centre-forward.

Honours
St Martin's
All-Ireland Senior Club Hurling Championship (1): 1985
Leinster Senior Club Hurling Championship (1): 1985
Kilkenny Senior Hurling Championship (1): 1984

Kilkenny
All-Ireland Senior Hurling Championship (1): 1979
Leinster Senior Hurling Championship (1): 1979

References

1951 births
Living people
Kilkenny inter-county hurlers
St Martin's (Kilkenny) hurlers